The 2012 National Club Baseball Association (NCBA) Division II World Series was played at Golden Park in Columbus, GA from May 18 to May 22. The fifth tournament's champion was Hofstra University.

Format
The format is similar to the NCAA College World Series in that eight teams participate in two four-team double elimination brackets. There are a few differences between the NCAA and the NCBA format. One of which is that the losers of Games 1–4 move to the other half of the bracket. Another difference is that the NCBA plays a winner take all for its national title game while the NCAA has a best-of-3 format to determine its national champion. Another difference which is between NCBA Division I and II is that Division II games are 7 innings while Division I games are 9 innings.

Participants
Hofstra
Illinois†
Kennesaw State
Maryland†
Penn State†
Texas A&M Corps of Cadets
Wisconsin†
Wyoming
† denotes school also fielded an NCBA Division I team that season

Results

Bracket

Game results

Championship game

Notes
Hofstra's 5–1 title game victory over Illinois set an NCBA Division II World Series record for largest margin of victory in a championship game. This record still holds through the 2013 season as this could be broken in the 2014 title game.

See also
2012 NCBA Division I World Series

References

2012 in baseball
Baseball in Georgia (U.S. state)
National Club Baseball Association
NCBA Division II